Carl Edvard Johan Dahl (6 August 1856 – 15 August 1929) was a New Zealand businessman, importer, vice consul and community leader. He was born in Kalundborg, Denmark on 6 August 1856.

References

1856 births
1929 deaths
New Zealand businesspeople
People from Kalundborg